Lemery, officially the Municipality of Lemery,  is a 4th class municipality in the province of Iloilo, Philippines. According to the 2020 census, it has a population of 31,414 people.

Lemery was created from the barrios of Lemery, Tabunan, Tuburan, Nagsulang, Daga, Tuguis, Singcua, Agpipili, Pacuan, Milan, Alagiñgay, Tuga, Bajo, San Antonio, Capeñahan, Bankal, Geroñgan, Omio, Nasapahan, Abuac-Dalipe, San Jose, Cabantohan, Dapdapan, Butuan, Anabo, and Buenavista from the municipality of Sara by virtue of Republic Act No. 197, enacted June 22, 1947. It was named after Spanish governor-general José Lemery e Ibarrola Ney.

Geography

Barangays

Lemery is politically subdivided into 31 barangays.

Climate

Demographics

Economy

References

External links
 [ Philippine Standard Geographic Code]
 Philippine Census Information
 Local Governance Performance Management System

Municipalities of Iloilo